The term megadiverse  country refers to any one of a group of nations that harbor the majority of Earth's species and high numbers of endemic species. Conservation International identified 17 megadiverse countries in 1998. Many of them are located in, or partially in, tropical or subtropical regions.

Megadiversity means exhibiting great biodiversity. The main criterion for megadiverse countries is endemism at the level of species, genera and families. A megadiverse country must have at least 5,000 species of endemic plants and must border marine ecosystems.

In 2002, Mexico formed a separate organization focusing on Like-Minded Megadiverse Countries, consisting of countries rich in biological diversity and associated traditional knowledge. This organization includes all but three megadiverse countries as identified by Conservation International.

List of megadiverse countries
In alphabetical order, the 17 megadiverse countries are:

List of most biodiverse countries 2022

Cancún initiative and declaration of like-minded megadiverse countries 

On 18 February 2002, the Ministers in charge of the Environment and the Delegates of Brazil, China, Colombia, Costa Rica, India, Indonesia, Kenya, Mexico, Peru, the Philippines, South Africa and Venezuela assembled in Cancún, Mexico. These countries declared to set up a Group of Like-Minded Megadiverse Countries as a mechanism for consultation and cooperation so that their interests and priorities, related to the preservation and sustainable use of biological diversity, could be promoted. They also declared that they would call on those countries that had not become Parties to the Convention on Biological Diversity, the Cartagena Protocol on Biosafety, and the Kyoto Protocol on climate change to become parties to these agreements.

At the same time, they agreed to meet periodically, at the ministerial and expert levels, and decided that upon the conclusion of each annual Ministerial Meeting, the next rotating host country would take on the role of Secretary of the group, to ensure its continuity, the further development of cooperation among these countries, and to reach the various agreements and objectives. Later, in 2010, Guatemala and Iran were also included in the list.

List of current member countries
The current member countries of the Like-Minded Megadiverse Countries organization are as follows, in alphabetical order:

See also 
 Biodiversity
 Biodiversity hotspot

References

External links

Biodiversity
Biogeography